Nelson Ascencio (born August 30, 1964) is a Cuban-American actor and comedian. Ascencio is most notable for his membership in the recurring cast of comedians on sketch comedy series MADtv and for playing Flavius in The Hunger Games film series.

Life and career
Nelson Ascencio was born in Guayos, Cuba but fled his homeland when he was very young. He then immigrated to Tarrytown, NY, where he started acting in his early teens with local theater and school productions. He continued his acting training after high school at the prestigious American Academy of Dramatic Arts and the HB Studios. While living in Manhattan, Ascencio perfected his comedy skills by doing some stand up. Then he moved to Los Angeles, California where he took classes at the Groundlings Theatre. Since then he has written, performed and produced his own sketch shows with the comedy group Unsafe Sketch at HBO Workspace, Luna Park, The Upfront and Theatre at the Improv. His television credits include appearances on The Larry Sanders Show and Seinfeld.

Ascencio joined the cast of MADtv in 1999 as a feature performer, for the fifth season, becoming the show's first Cuban-American cast member, as well as the second one to be born outside of North America (after Bryan Callen), and the second Latino cast member at the time (after Pablo Francisco). However, Ascencio was later promoted to a repertory performer status at the beginning of the sixth season, but left at the end.

In February, 2012 Ascencio joined the cast of Don't Tell My Mother! (Live Storytelling), a monthly showcase in which celebrities share comedic accounts of stories they would never want their mothers to know.

Ascencio appeared in The Hunger Games (2012), as Flavius, a part of Katniss Everdeen's (Jennifer Lawrence) prep team. He reprised his role in the sequel The Hunger Games: Catching Fire (2013).

Filmography

Television appearances

Film appearances

References

External links

Official MADtv site

1964 births
Living people
Cuban emigrants to the United States
American male comedians
American impressionists (entertainers)
American male television actors
American male film actors
American entertainers of Cuban descent
Male actors from Havana
Male actors from New York (state)
21st-century American male actors
20th-century American male actors
American sketch comedians
Comedians from New York (state)
20th-century American comedians
21st-century American comedians